Domenico "Memo" Benassi (21 June 1886 – 24 February 1957) was an Italian film actor who appeared in more than forty films in a mixture of leading and supporting roles. He played the composer Beethoven in the 1942 film Rossini.

Selected filmography

 Notte di tempesta (1916)
 Mimì e gli straccioni (1916)
 Il gioiello sinistro (1917)
 La nemica (1917)
 Margheritella (1918)
 La scala di seta (1920)
 The Love Letters of Baroness S (1924) - Straßenmusikant Giovanni
 The Adventures of Sybil Brent (1925) - Theo Hartwig, Schriftsteller
 The Old Lady (1932) - Joe
 The Lucky Diamond (1933) - Il maggiordomo
 Il trattato scomparso (1933) - John Brown - detective
 The Haller Case (1933) - Judge Haller
 L'impiegata di papà (1934) - Banchiere Monti
 Everybody's Woman (1934) - Leonardo Nanni
 Conquest of the Air (1936) - Francesco Lama di Brescia (uncredited)
 Lady of Paradise (1937) - Matteo Iran
 Scipione l'africano (1937) - Cato
 Tonight at Eleven (1938) - L'ambasciatore Leopoldo Norton
 Princess Tarakanova (1938) - L'ambasciatore russo
 La conquista dell'aria (1939) - Il Gesuita Franceesco Lama
 Orizzonte dipinto (1941) - Il burattinaio
 Il vagabondo (1941) - Fanfulla
 The Jester's Supper (1942) - Il Tornaquinci
 The Two Orphans (1942) - Il conte di Linières
 Fedora (1942) - Il principe Yariskine
 Rossini (1942) - Beethoven
 I due Foscari (1942) - Donato Almorò
 Quarta pagina (1942) - Il pazzo
 The Son of the Red Corsair (1943) - Il marchese di Montelimar
 Measure for Measure (1943) - Lucio
 Peccatori (1945)
 Paese senza pace (1946) - Padron Toni
 L'ultimo sogno (1946)
 The Tyrant of Padua (1946) - Cesare, il pittore
 La taverna della libertà (1950)
 The Affairs of Messalina (1951) - Claudio / Claude
 Red Shirts (1952) - (uncredited)
 Too Bad She's Bad (1954) - (uncredited)
 Adriana Lecouvreur (1955) - Michonnet

References

External links

Bibliography
 Mathew, Nicholas & Walton, Benjamin. The Invention of Beethoven and Rossini: Historiography, Analysis, Criticism. Cambridge University Press, 2013.

1886 births
1957 deaths
Actors from the Province of Parma
Italian male film actors
Italian male silent film actors
Italian male stage actors
20th-century Italian male actors